Asnières-sur-Seine is a commune in the Hauts-de-Seine department and Île-de-France region of north-central France. It lies on the left bank of the river Seine, some eight kilometres from the centre of Paris in the north-western suburbs of the French capital.
The inhabitants are called the Asniérois and the Asniéroises in French.

Name

Asnières-sur-Seine was originally known simply as Asnières. The name was recorded for the first time in a papal bull of 1158 – as Asnerias, from Medieval Latin asinaria, meaning "donkey farm". The poor soil of Asnières, where heather grew in medieval times, was probably deemed suitable only for the breeding of donkeys. By the early 20th century it had become a favourite boating centre for Parisians, and its industries included boat building.

On 15 February 1968 the commune was officially renamed Asnières-sur-Seine to distinguish it from other French communes also called Asnières.

Demographics

Immigration

Departmental representation
The commune is divided between two cantons (departmental constituencies):
Asnières-sur-Seine: composed of part of the commune of Asnières-sur-Seine. Currently represented by Josiane Fischer (UDI) and André Mancipoz (LR).
Courbevoie-1: composed of part of the commune of Courbevoie and of the remainder of the commune of Asnières-sur-Seine. Currently represented by Daniel Courtès (LR) and Marie-Pierre Limoge (UDI).

Economy
Lesieur – a major producer of cooking and table oils and part of the Avril Group – has its headquarters in Asnières.

Education

Public schools
(fully financed by the commune, department, or region):
 20 kindergarten / nursery schools (écoles maternelles);
 16 elementary / primary schools (écoles élémentaires);
 4 junior high schools: the Collège André Malraux, the Collège Auguste Renoir, the Collège François Truffaut, and the Collège Voltaire;
 3 senior high schools: the Lycée d'enseignement adapté Martin Luther King, the Lycée professionnel de Prony, and the Lycée général et technologique Auguste Renoir;
 additionally, the Institut départemental médico-éducatif Gustave Baguer specializes in the education of hearing-impaired children and young people.

Private schools
(partly financed by the commune, department, or region) include:
 The École catholique Sainte-Agnès (preschool and elementary school)
 The Institution Saint-Joseph (preschool through junior high school)
 The Institution Sainte-Geneviève (preschool through senior high school)

Communications

Public transport
Asnières-sur-Seine is served by three stations on Paris Métro Line 13: Gabriel Péri, Les Agnettes, and Les Courtilles, the last named being the terminus of the line.

Line 1 of the Île-de-France tramway also serves the metro station at Les Courtilles, connecting it to Noisy-le-Sec.

Trains on Lines J (Gisors) and L (Cergy) of the Transilien Paris-Saint-Lazare suburban rail network call at Asnières-sur-Seine station, while those on Line L (Cergy) also serve Bois-Colombes station which lies just outside the western limit of the commune.

A number of bus routes – lines 140, 165, 175, 177, and 276 – run through Asnières and connect it to its neighbouring communes.

Roads
Car traffic in Asnières is difficult. Most of the traffic is on the banks of the Seine around the city. The crossing of the Asnières bridge is extremely crowded and slow during peak hours. The Grand rue Charles-de-Gaulle then the Avenue d'Argenteuil are also difficult to pass because serving Bois-Colombes and northern towns. Moreover, the city has very few parking spaces, and garages and private parking spaces are scarce and expensive.

Between 2010 and 2013, there was a development plan to change the streets of the city being one-way and become practicable in both directions for bicycles.

Sport
In addition to the Courtilles ice rink, the town has ten gyms, six stadiums, a shooting range, two tennis clubs (Azur Tennis Club and the Tennis Club du Ménil), a skate park, a Parisian boules court and a swimming pool.

The Asnières Volley 92 participates in Ligue B (2nd national level) and plays at the Courtilles gymnasium. The city also has a handball club in agreement with neighboring cities. For the 2017–2018 season, the first team evolves in Pool 2 in National 2. Finally, the city counts, with the Molosses, an American football club, created in 1992, evolving in Casque d'Or (D2), 2-time vice-champion of France of D1 (1999, and 2014).

A full-contact club, known as ABC (Asnieres Boxing Club) is also managed by a coaching team composed with ex-France and European champions. Around 100 members take part in trainings three times a Week (Monday, Wednesday and Friday). The judo and jujitsu club Arts Martiaux d'Asnières uses several of the town's gyms.

Asnières in art

Georges Seurat

Bathers at Asnières by Georges Seurat depicts a scene of 19th century leisure and developing industry in this suburb of Paris.

Between 1884 and 1886 Seurat painted Sunday Afternoon on the Island of La Grand Jatte, using a new technique – which came to be known as pointillism – of forming an image from patterns of tiny coloured dots.

Vincent van Gogh

Vincent van Gogh made a series of paintings of Asnières. Influenced by impressionism and pointillism, he modified his traditional style and used vivid colour, shorter brushstrokes, and perspective to engage the viewer. His views of the banks of the Seine represent an important progression towards his later landscape paintings. In Asnières, within walking distance of his brother Theo's flat in Montmartre, van Gogh painted parks, cafés, restaurants, and the river.

Twin towns – sister cities

Asnières-sur-Seine is twinned with:
 Spandau (Berlin), Germany
 Stockton-on-Tees, England, United Kingdom

Notable people
Gaston Rivierre (1862–1942), cyclist
Henri Barbusse (1873–1935), politician and writer, a street in the town was named after him
Maurice Hewitt (1884–1971), violinist
Ginette Keller (born 1925), composer
Frédéric Gorny (born 1973), actor
William Gallas (born 1977), footballer
Axel Ngando (born 1993), footballer
Barbara Pravi (born 1993), singer (born in the town but moved shortly after birth)

The old château was the death place of Anne Marie Victoire de Bourbon (1675–1700), daughter of Henri Jules de Bourbon and thus grand daughter of le Grand Condé, cousin to Louis XIV.

The Franco-Irish composer and pianist George O'Kelly died here in 1914.

Louis Vuitton opened his first workshop and resided here until his death. The workshop still stands today and some emblematic pieces are still made there (rigid trunks, leather models).

The Hutu Rwandan businessman and suspected war criminal Félicien Kabuga was arrested here on 16 May 2020 after 26 years as a fugitive for crimes against humanity committed during the Rwandan genocide. Specifically, he is accused of funding the genocide as well as buying thousands of machetes and importing them into Rwanda for use as weapons to kill Tutsis during the genocide.

Local landmarks
The Château d'Asnières is a stately home dating from the mid 18th century.
The Cimetière des Chiens in Asnières, dating from 1899, is believed to be Europe's oldest public pet cemetery (or "zoological necropolis").

See also
Communes of the Hauts-de-Seine department

References

External links

Asnières-sur-Seine official website 

Cities in Île-de-France
Communes of Hauts-de-Seine